Epher (also Ephera'im or Effrain, ( ʿĒp̄er)) was a grandson of Abraham, according to Gen. 25:4, whose descendants, Jewish historian Flavius Josephus claimed, had invaded Libya. Josephus also claimed that Epher's name was the etymological root of the continent Africa. According to the Bible, he was a son of Midian. According to Cleodemus Malchus, Epher's daughter married Hercules.

References

Book of Genesis people
Midian